The 2011–12 Southern Professional Hockey League season was the eighth season of the Southern Professional Hockey League.  The season began October 20, 2011, and ended April 14, 2012, after a 56-game regular season and an eight-team playoff.  The Columbus Cottonmouths captured their second SPHL championship.

Preseason
The Mississippi RiverKings joined the SPHL after 19 seasons in the Central Hockey League.  With 9 teams now in the SPHL, the league adopted an 8-team playoff format, with all rounds using best-of-three game series.

Regular season

Final standings

‡  William B. Coffey Trophy winners
 Advanced to playoffs

Attendance

President's Cup playoffs

* indicates overtime game.

Finals
All times are local (EDT/CDT)

Awards
The SPHL All-Rookie team was announced March 26, 2012, followed by the All-SPHL teams on March 27, Defenseman of the Year on March 28, Rookie of the Year on March 29, Goaltender of the Year on April 2, Coach of the Year on April 3, and Most Valuable Player on April 4.

All-SPHL selections

References

Southern Professional Hockey League seasons
South